Manipal Academy of Higher Education (MAHE) is a private deemed university located in Manipal, India. The university also has campuses in  Mangalore, Bangalore  and Jamshedpur in India , and global campus in Dubai and Malacca (Malaysia). As of 2021, Manipal offers more than 350 programs across 30 disciplines and ranks 7th among Indian universities.

Manipal group have two more universities in india Sikkim Manipal University(SMU),  and Manipal University Jaipur(MUJ) other than MAHE.

History
In 1953, Dr. T. M. A. Pai founded India's first private medical school, the Kasturba Medical College, and five years later the Manipal Institute of Technology was established. Initially, degrees were awarded by Karnataka University, Dharwad and later by the University of Mysore. From 1980 to 1993 they were awarded by Mangalore University. The current organizational structure was formed in 1993, when Kasturba Medical College and Manipal College of Dental Sciences were accorded deemed university status by UGC. Manipal Institute of Technology became a constituent unit of Manipal Academy of Higher Education in 2000.

Constituent Units

Campuses

Manipal campus 
It is divided into the health sciences campus and the MIT campus. The campus has a large library, an indoor sports complex and a museum.

Bengaluru campus 
MAHE Bengaluru campus covers 126 acres of land, is located in Yelahanka, Bengaluru. It was incepted in 2021 and has undergraduate and postgraduate programmes across engineering, commerce, arts, law, management, regenerative medicine, and public policy domains. The new campus is under construction, few academic blocks and hostel blocks, outdoor sports ground etc. completed now. More academic blocks, new cafeteria, auditorium, in-door sports complex and more hostel blocks are under construction.  

Manipal Institute of Technology (MIT), T.A. Pai Management Institute (TAPMI), Manipal Law School (MLS) started in MAHE Bengaluru campus.

Mangalore campus 
The Mangalore campus covers 31 acres of land, offers health science courses and is largely divided into the Centre for Basic Sciences at Bejai and the main campus at Light House Hill Road. The Mangalore campus includes the Dr. TMA Pai International Convention Centre at MG Road.

MAHE also has campuses in Jamshedpur, Malacca and Dubai.

Faculties 
Manipal Academy of Higher Education is divided into the

 Faculty of Health Sciences
 Faculty of Science, Technology & Management
 Faculty of Humanities, Liberal Arts & Social Sciences

Academics

Rankings 

Internationally, Manipal Academy of Higher Education was ranked 751–800 in the QS World University Rankings of 2023 and 215 in Asia. It was ranked 801–1000 in the world by the Times Higher Education World University Rankings of 2023, 351–400 in Asia in 2022 and 301–350 among emerging economies.
In India, the National Institutional Ranking Framework (NIRF) ranked Manipal Academy of Higher Education 15th overall and 7th among universities in 2021. NIRF also ranked the Manipal College of Pharmaceutical Sciences 8th.

Libraries
Manipal Academy of Higher Education library system comprises six libraries spread across its Medical, Humanities and Engineering school campuses.

Research
Budgetary provisions are given for research through capital allocations for the maintenance of animal facility, consumables, equipment etc.  was sanctioned to the Manipal Institute of Technology in 2008–2009 towards funding innovation. MCOPS, Manipal sends its second-year postgraduate (PG) students for collaborative research programs at R&D centers all over the country. Often the research carried out by them becomes a part of the intellectual property of the company.

The Manipal Life Science Centre has a research team and is undertaking several research projects funded by DBT, DST, etc. MLSC is linked to several international research institutions such as Wistar Institute Philadelphia, University of Queensland, and many more.

Manipal Advanced Research Group
The Manipal Advanced Research Group was formed in early 2006 with an aim to grow new research projects in fundamental sciences and promote interdisciplinary cooperation in areas between basic research, biomedical science and engineering.

Notable alumni

Rajeev Chandrasekhar, Indian politician and multimillionaire entrepreneur who is currently serving as Union Minister of State & Member of Parliament in the upper house (Rajya Sabha) of the Indian Parliament.
Rajeev Suri, CEO of Inmarsat
Satya Nadella, CEO of Microsoft
Devi Shetty, Indian billionaire entrepreneur and cardiac surgeon 
Shamsheer Vayalil, an Indian radiologist and billionaire businessman. He is the founder, chairman and managing director of VPS Healthcare Group and the vice chairman and managing director of Amanat Holdings, a healthcare and education investment company.
M. G. George Muthoot, billionaire businessman and chairman of The Muthoot Group.
Pankaj Oswal, billionaire, chairman and sole founder of Burrup Holdings Limited.
Vinod K Jose:, Journalist and Editor of The Caravan.
Mirza Faizan, Indian aerospace scientist who developed the Ground Reality Information Processing System (GRIPS).
Arun Shenoy, Grammy Award-nominated musician
Nag Ashwin, an Indian film director.
Anant J Talaulicar, president and CEO, Cummins India Ltd.
Vikas Khanna, Michelin Guide Star Chef
Annapoorna Kini, American cardiologist and a Professor of Cardiology at Mount Sinai School of Medicine in New York City.
Sheikh Muszaphar Shukor, Malaysian orthopedic surgeon and the first Malaysian astronaut.
Esha Gupta, Bollywood actor and model.
Disha Oberoi, popularly known as R J Disha, is a Radio Jockey from Bangalore, India.
Nithya Menen, Indian actress.

References

External links

 

Institutes of Eminence
Educational institutions established in 1953
Educational institutions established in 1993
Deemed universities in India
1953 establishments in Mysore State
1993 establishments in Karnataka
Universities and colleges in Udupi district
Udupi